Teodorów  is a village in the administrative district of Gmina Krzywda, within Łuków County, Lublin Voivodeship, in eastern Poland.

The village has a population of 200.

References

Villages in Łuków County